SM UB-22 was a German Type UB II submarine or U-boat in the German Imperial Navy during World War I. The U-boat was ordered on 30 April 1915 and launched on 9 October 1915. She was commissioned into the German Imperial Navy on 2 March 1915 as SM UB-22.

Design
A German Type UB II submarine, UB-22 had a displacement of  when at the surface and  while submerged. The submarine was powered by two Körting six-cylinder, four-stroke diesel engines each producing a total , a Siemens-Schuckert electric motor producing , and one propeller shaft.

UB-22 was fitted with two  torpedo tubes, four torpedoes, and one  SK L/40 deck gun. She had a complement of twenty-one crew members and two officers and a 45-second dive time.

Summary of raiding history

References

Notes

Citations

Bibliography 

 

1915 ships
Ships built in Hamburg
World War I submarines of Germany
German Type UB II submarines
U-boats commissioned in 1916
Maritime incidents in 1918
U-boats sunk in 1918
U-boats sunk by mines
World War I shipwrecks in the North Sea
Ships lost with all hands